Supriya Chaudhuri (born 1953) is an Indian scholar of English literature. She is Professor Emerita at Kolkata's Jadavpur University.

Biography
She was born in Delhi, India and grew up in Europe and India.
She was educated at South Point High School, Presidency College, Calcutta and then University of Oxford, where she was a State Scholar from 1973 to 1975, taking a First in English.
After serving a few years at Presidency as Assistant Professor of English, she returned to Oxford on an Inlaks Scholarship (1978–81) for doctoral research in Renaissance Studies. She was awarded D.Phil. in 1981. She joined the faculty of Jadavpur University after having taught at Presidency College and Calcutta University. She was in charge of the UGC funded research programme of the university's English Department. Her scholarship ranges over many fields, notably literary theory, 18th century British literature, modernism, and the Renaissance. She specializes in the history of ideas.

She was an Oxford badminton half-blue in 1975, University of Oxford. She holds a black belt in Kyokushinkaikan karate.

Selected works

As editor
 (with Sukanta Chaudhuri) .
 (with Sajni Mukherji) .
 .

As contributor

As translator
Rabindranath Tagore, Relationships (Jogajog), translated by Supriya Chaudhuri, The Oxford Tagore Translation

References

External links

 Academia.edu profile
 Moral Economies of Wellbeing
 Supriya Chaudhuri on Google Scholar

1953 births
21st-century Indian women writers
21st-century Indian writers
Academic staff of Jadavpur University Department of English
Living people
Presidency University, Kolkata alumni
Academic staff of Presidency University, Kolkata
University of Calcutta alumni
Academic staff of the University of Calcutta
Women writers from West Bengal
Writers from Kolkata